This is a list of football clubs in Latvia as of the current 2023 season.

As of 2023, 77 teams are competing in the Latvian football league system: 10 in Virslīga, 14 in 1.līga, 16 in 2.līga, and 37 in 3.līga.

Virslīga

 BFC Daugavpils (Daugavpils)
 FK Auda (Ķekava)
 FK Jelgava (Jelgava)
 FK Liepāja (Liepāja)
 FK METTA (Rīga)
 FK RFS (Riga)
 FK Spartaks (Jūrmala)
 FK Tukums 2000 (Tukums)
 Riga FC (Rīga)
 Valmiera FC (Valmiera)

1. līga

 AFA Olaine (Olaine)
 FK Beitar (Babīte)
 FK RFS-2 (Riga)
 FK Tukums 2000-2 (Tukums)
 FK Karosta (Liepāja)
 FK Ventspils (Ventspils)
 Grobiņas SC (Grobiņa)
 JDFS Alberts (Rīga)
 Leevon Saldus (Saldus)
 Riga FC-2 (Riga)
 Salaspils FC (Salaspils)
 Skanstes SK (Riga)
 SK Super Nova (Salaspils)
 Valmiera FC-2 (Riga)

2. līga

Second League West
 FK Aliance (Riga)
 FK Dinamo Riga (Riga)
 FK Ķekava/Auda (Ķekava)
 FK Liepāja-2 (Liepāja)
 FK PPK/Betsafe (Riga)
 JDFS Alberts-2 (Riga)
 Mārupes SC (Mārupe)
 Ogre United (Ogre)

Second League East
 FK Kalupe (Kalupe)
 FK Krāslava (Krāslava)
 FK Limbaži (Limbaži)
 FK Priekuļi (Priekuļi)
 FK Smiltene/BJSS (Smiltene)
 FK Staiceles Bebri (Staicele)
 Jēkabpils SC (Jēkabpils)
 Rēzeknes FA/BJSS (Rēzekne)

3. līga

Third League Centre

 ASK Kadaga (Ādaži)
 Babītes SK (Babīte)
 FK Beitar-2 (Babīte)
 FK Jūrnieks (Riga)
 FK Olaine/Union (Olaine)
 JFK Daugava (Riga)
 JRFPC Upesciema Warriors (Upesciems)
 Riga United FC (Riga)
 RTU FC (Riga)
 SK Kengaroos (Riga)

Third League West

 Bauskas BJSS/Mēmele (Bauska)
 Dienvidkurzemes FK (Grobiņa)
 FK Dobele Allegro (Dobele)
 FK Iecava (Iecava)
 FK Jelgava-2 (Jelgava)
 FK Tukums 2000-3 (Tukums)
 JFC Jelgava (Jelgava)
 Saldus SS/Brocēnu BJSS (Saldus)

Third League North

 DSVK Traktors (Riga)
 FK Alberts (Salaspils)
 FK Cēsis (Cēsis)
 FK Kvarcs (Madona)
 FK Lielupe (Jūrmala)
 FK Pļaviņas DM (Pļaviņas)
 FK Sigulda (Sigulda)
 FK Valka (Valka)
 Futbola Parks Academy/LSPA (Riga)

Third League East

 Augšdaugavas NSS (Ilūkste)
 Balvu SC (Balvi)
 FK Gauja (Valmiera)
 FK Līvāni (Līvāni)
 FK Ludza (Ludza)
 FK Varakļāni (Varakļāni)
 Gulbenes BJSS (Gulbene)
 Preiļu BJSS (Preiļi)
 Rēzeknes FA/BJSS-2 (Rēzekne)
 Rēzeknes NBJSS (Rēzekne)

Defunct or inactive

 FK Eurobaltija (Riga)
 FC Noah Jurmala (Jūrmala)
 FK Dinamo-Rīnuži/LASD (Riga)
 FK Jēkabpils/JSC (Jēkabpils)
 FK Latvijas finieris (Riga)
 FK Ogre (Ogre)
 FK Zibens/Zemessardze (Ilūkste)
 JFK Saldus (Saldus)
 Nordeka LFKA
 SFK Varavīksne (Liepāja)
 Skonto FC (Riga)

See also
Latvian football league system
Latvian Higher League
List of football teams

References

External links
  League321.com - Latvian club stats records.
 Lff.lv - Latvian Football Federation official website.

 
Latvia
Football
Football clubs